Zeidora is a genus of sea snails, marine gastropod mollusks in the family Fissurellidae, the keyhole limpets.

Species
Species within the genus Zeidora include:
Zeidora antarctica Aldea, Zelaya & Troncoso, 2011
Zeidora bahamondei Rehder, 1980
Zeidora bigelowi Pérez Farfante, 1947
Zeidora calceolina Adams, 1860
Zeidora crepidula Simone & Cunha, 2014 
Zeidora flabellum (Dall, 1896)
Zeidora galapagensis (McLean, 1970)
Zeidora lodderae (Tate & May, 1900)
Zeidora maoria Powell, 1936
Zeidora milerai Espinosa, Ortea & Fernandez-Garces, 2004
Zeidora naufraga Watson, 1883
Zeidora neritica Espinosa, Ortea & Fernandez-Garces, 2004
Zeidora nesta (Pilsbry, 1890)
Zeidora pussa Simone & Cunha, 2014 
Zeidora reticulata Adams, 1862
Zeidora tasmanica (Beddome, 1883)
Species brought into synonymy
Zeidora candida (Adams, 1870): synonym of Zeidora nesta (Pilsbry, 1890)
Zeidora legrandi Tate, 1894: synonym of Zeidora tasmanica (Beddome, 1883)
Zeidora limatulaeformis Horikoshi, 1944: synonym of Zeidora calceolina A. Adams, 1860

References

 Higo, S., Callomon, P. & Goto, Y. (1999) Catalogue and Bibliography of the Marine Shell-Bearing Mollusca of Japan. Elle Scientific Publications, Yao, Japan, 749 pp.
 Gofas, S.; Le Renard, J.; Bouchet, P. (2001). Mollusca, in: Costello, M.J. et al. (Ed.) (2001). European register of marine species: a check-list of the marine species in Europe and a bibliography of guides to their identification. Collection Patrimoines Naturels, 50: pp. 180–213
 Spencer, H.; Marshall. B. (2009). All Mollusca except Opisthobranchia. In: Gordon, D. (Ed.) (2009). New Zealand Inventory of Biodiversity. Volume One: Kingdom Animalia. 584 pp
 Aldea C., Zelaya D.G. & Troncoso J.S. (2011) A new gigantic species of Zeidora Adams, 1860 from Antarctic waters (Gastropoda: Fissurellidae). The Nautilus 125(2): 79-82

Fissurellidae